Thomas A. Robinett Jr. (born June 21, 1949) is an American politician who served in the Kansas House of Representatives as a Republican from the 29th district for one term, in 1993 and 1994.

References

Living people
1949 births
Republican Party members of the Kansas House of Representatives
20th-century American politicians
Politicians from Overland Park, Kansas